A Touch of Cloth is the 1999 album by Fila Brazillia. The song "The Bugs Will Bite" was featured in the 2001 video game Mat Hoffman's Pro BMX as the main menu music.

Critical reception

AllMusic described the album as "solid". Exclaim! reviewed it as "working toward chills than spills" along with commenting on the 'hard funk and guitar elements' that adds "luxurious grooves with Moog-ish keys and jazzy horns."

Track listing

References

1999 albums
Fila Brazillia albums